The timeline of racial tension in Omaha, Nebraska lists events in African-American history in Omaha.  These included racial violence, but also include many firsts as the black community built its institutions.  Omaha has been a major industrial city on the edge of what was a rural, agricultural state.  It has attracted a more diverse population than the rest of the state. Its issues were common to other major industrial cities of the early 20th century, as it was a  destination for 19th and 20th century European immigrants, and internal white and black migrants from the South in the Great Migration. Many early 20th-century conflicts arose out of labor struggles, postwar social tensions and economic problems, and hiring of later immigrants and black migrants as strikebreakers in the meatpacking and stockyard industries. Massive job losses starting in the 1960s with the restructuring of the railroad, stockyards and meatpacking industries contributed to economic and social problems for workers in the city.

19th century

1900 to 1950

1950 to 2000 

According to several prominent Omaha historians, racial discrimination was a significant issue in Omaha from the 1950s through the 2000s (decade). Analyzing race relations in Omaha during the period they commented, "1968 rivals 1919 as probably the worst year in the history of twentieth-century America from the standpoint of violence and internal tension." In 1969 three days of rioting swept the Near North Side, and in 1970 a policeman was killed by a suitcase bomb while answering a disturbance call at a house in North Omaha. However, as the 1966 Oscar-nominated documentary A Time for Burning and the 1970s books of Lois Mark Stalvey illustrated, the violence apparently served a purpose as lines of communication were opened between the "West Omaha matron and the black laborer."

2000s

See also
History of North Omaha, Nebraska
Timeline of North Omaha, Nebraska history
History of Omaha, Nebraska
Civil Rights Movement in Omaha, Nebraska
African Americans in Omaha, Nebraska
Greeks in Omaha, Nebraska
Timeline of riots and civil unrest in Omaha, Nebraska
 Racial tension in Omaha, Nebraska
 Ernie Chambers, state senator representing a district in North Omaha; in Nebraska's history, the only African-American to have run for governor and the US Senate and longest-serving state senator.

References

External links
Fast Facts about Omaha's African American community
Discover North Omaha website
Discover Black Omaha website

North Omaha, Nebraska
Douglas County, Nebraska
Omaha, Nebraska
African-American history in Omaha, Nebraska
African-American
Urban decay in the United States
Racially motivated violence in the United States
Racial tension
South Omaha, Nebraska
Crime in Omaha, Nebraska
History of African-American civil rights